Misnebalam (or also known as: Hacienda de Misnébalam) is a Commisary and former Hacienda of the municipality of Progreso in the Yucatán State, Mexico. This Commisary is known for being uninhabited, for this reason, it is considered a "Ghost town".

Place names 

The name of Misnebalam comes from "Misné" which means in the Yucatec Mayan language: Tail of cats and "Balam" which means: Jaguar.

Location of Misnebalam 

Misnebalam is located at the end of a deviation at kilometer 15 of the Mérida-Progreso highway.

Infrastructure 

The deteriorated remains of a hacienda a reconstruction are located. The structures have been deteriorating due to the climate of the region and tree branches have grown covering entrances to buildings and abandoned houses.

Historical importance 

It had its splendor during the time of the henequen boom and issued hacienda tokens which due to their design, are of interest to numismatists. Said files accredit the hacienda as property of Fidencio Gertrudis Márquez.

Demography 

According to the 2005 census carried out by the INEGI, the population of the town was 0 inhabitants, which continues to this day.

Legend 

Fidencio Gertrudis Márquez would establish Misnebalam in the year of 1900, this Hacienda along with others in Yucatán would be dedicated solely to the Henequen Industry, over the years, Mr. Fidencio would make Misnebalam one of the largest haciendas in Yucatán, surpassing others in size and henequen production, too Misnebalam was a paradise for workers due to the good conditions that this population had, something that other haciendas did not have in the times of the Post-Mexican Revolution.

One day in October 1921, Mr. Fidencio, His Son and a Worker were going back to the hacienda when they were ambushed by some men who beat him almost to death and left him for dead, despite the attack the three survived. attack and went to the hacienda, after this and for fear of being ambushed again and finally being killed, he would leave the hacienda in charge of his workers and then he would leave there.

A Foreman would remain in command of the hacienda, later the same foreman would abuse a boy nicknamed Juliancito, who after being abused, would confess to the Priest of the hacienda about his abuse by the Foreman, at night the boy would hang himself from one of the trees in the main courtyard, the next day the same priest would tell the child's parents, who would furiously try to find the foreman to make him pay, something they could not do because the foreman would escape from the ranch never to return.

After the death of the child, people from the hacienda would see him around with signs of hatred and detestation, over the years evil would take over the farm representing themselves as Black Monks and evil would also appear in other ways, after this Misnebalam it would be completely abandoned by all its inhabitants.

Gallery

References 

Ghost towns in Mexico